The Ontarion is an independent English-language student newspaper published at the University of Guelph in Guelph, Ontario. It publishes each month with over 10,000 copies distributed on and off campus during the fall and winter semester and, until the summer of 2017, it published bi-weekly during the summer semester. It has since ceased summer publication, while it continues regular publications throughout the traditional school year.

History
The newspaper's first edition was published on March 29, 1951. The paper served the students of the Ontario Agricultural College before the University of Guelph's amalgamation in 1964.

The newspaper was intended to serve students at all three founding colleges. One early editor reported that the paper's name came from the idea that the three schools might one day become the University of Ontario.

Over the years the newspaper has changed reflecting the growth on campus and changes in society, as well as the individuality of each new editor and various staff.

The social club atmosphere of the 1950s lead to Ontarion editors in the 1960s to 'stir up controversy' with articles about communism and boarding houses that advertised "whites preferred." One issue in fall 1970 was confiscated by the Royal Canadian Mounted Police at the printing plant because it contained a bulletin with the FLQ manifesto which was illegal under the War Measures Act.

In the 1980s to present day, editors have varied the focus from news and intellectual discussion to letters and opinion pieces in an effort to hear all voices on campus. One of the editors in the 1990s told students: "If you don't like what we're doing with the paper, you can volunteer to help change it...It's your paper."

The newspaper celebrated 50 years of publishing in 2001 and is still one of the few completely autonomous student newspapers in Canada.

Structure

The Ontarion is a student newspaper at a university without a journalism program. It depends on volunteer submissions and has been driven by citizen journalism since long before the term was coined. Undergraduate students need no experience to join and getting involved is only a matter of contacting a member of the newspaper's staff. This is often done at Thursday volunteer meetings. The Thursday volunteer meeting is an Ontarion tradition where volunteers come out, eat pizza, listen to the editors talk about the stories they're looking to have written that week and socialize.

The Ontarion's staff is made up of two departments. The business department includes the ad designer, ad manager, office manager and business manager. The editorial staff is made up of a copy editor, layout director, photo & graphics editor, news editor, sports editor and arts & culture editor. The editorial staff reports to the editor in chief, who reports to the Board of Directors.

The Board of Directors are members of the corporation who have been voted onto the board. They meet once per month to manage the behind the scenes work that keeps the Ontarion going: human resources, policy, public relations and finances.

The organization is a non-profit corporation.

2017-2018 masthead
Editorial staff
Editor-in-chief: Mirali Almaula
News editor: Tiann Nantais
Arts & culture editor: Will Wellington 
Sports & health editor: Matteo Cimellaro 
Digital content editor: Karen K. Tran 
Copy editor: Carolynn Whitehouse

Production staff
Photo & graphics editor: Alora Griffiths
Director of layout & design: Frances Esenwa

Business staff 
Business coordinator: Lorrie Taylor
Office manager: Aaron Jacklin
Advertising & marketing coordinator: Patrick Sutherland 
Circulation director: Sal Moran

Board of directors
President: Heather Gilmore
Chair of the board: Jordan Terpstra 
VP communications: --
VP finance: Mehkansh Sharma

Directors 
Emma Callon
Miriam Habib 
Alex Lefebvre 
Jonathan Marun-Batista 
Josh Millen 
Megan Scarth

See also
List of student newspapers in Canada
List of newspapers in Canada

Further reading

References

External links 
 

Student newspapers published in Ontario
University of Guelph
Newspapers published in Guelph
Publications established in 1951
Weekly newspapers published in Ontario
1951 establishments in Ontario